Lycomorphodes suspecta is a moth of the family Erebidae. It was described by Felder in 1875. It is found in the Brazilian states of Espírito Santo and São Paulo.

References

Cisthenina
Moths described in 1875